Li Zhaonan (born 22 September 1982) is a former Chinese footballer.

Career statistics

Club

Notes

Honours
Henan Jianye
China League One: 2013

References

1982 births
Living people
Chinese footballers
Association football defenders
Chinese Super League players
China League One players
Henan Songshan Longmen F.C. players